Risch is a surname. Notable people with the surname include:

Ernst Risch (1911–1988), Swiss hellenist and philologist
Joan Risch (born 1930), a Massachusetts woman who disappeared from her home in 1961
Jim Risch (born 1943), American politician
Maurice Risch (born 1943), French actor
Neil Risch, American geneticist
Pierre Risch (born 1943), French artist
Robert Henry Risch, a mathematician
Rudolf Risch (1908–1944), German cyclist
Vicki Risch, First Lady of Idaho